Behineh Rahbar Abadeh Football Club is an Iranian football club based in Abadeh, Iran. They competed in the 2011-12 Fars Premier League and finished first. As a result, next year they will be playing in 2012–13 Iran Football's 3rd Division

Season-by-Season

The table below shows the achievements of the club in various competitions.

See also
 Hazfi Cup 2010–11

Football clubs in Iran
Association football clubs established in 2008
2008 establishments in Iran